Government Engineering College, Bhojpur is a government technical institute in Bihar, India. It is affiliated with Aryabhatta Knowledge University. The institute offers full-time Bachelor of Technology (B.Tech.) degree programs in Electrical Engineering, Mechanical Engineering, Civil Engineering and Instrumentation Engineering.

History 
It was established in 2018 by the Government of Bihar under the Department of Science and Technology, Bihar.

Departments 
The college offers undergraduate courses, Bachelor of Technology in following disciples.

Admission 
Admission in the college is done by UGEAC conducted by Bihar Combined Entrance Competitive Examination Board.

College facilities 

 College Library
 Different clubs for student
 Computer LAB
 Anti-ragging committee

See also

References

External links 

Aryabhatta Knowledge University

Engineering colleges in Bihar
Colleges affiliated to Aryabhatta Knowledge University
2018 establishments in Bihar
Educational institutions established in 2018